The 1992 RTHK Top 10 Gold Songs Awards was held in 1992 for the 1991 music season.

Top 10 song awards
The top 10 songs (十大中文金曲) of 1992 are as follows.

Other awards

References
 RTHK top 10 gold song awards 1992

RTHK Top 10 Gold Songs Awards
Rthk Top 10 Gold Songs Awards, 1992
Rthk Top 10 Gold Songs Awards, 1992